Zoltán Heister (born 27 February 1961) is a Slovakian handball coach.

He achieved his first international success as a coach of the Slovakian national team for U-19, with whom he finished 6th at the European Championships in Luxembourg. He repeated the same success in 2004 at the European Championship in Serbia. He also led the national team U-21 twice at world tournaments: in Brazil  he finished 14th in 2003; and earned 6th place at the 2006 European Championships.

As a coach of senior national men's team he led it twice: at the European Championships in Norway in 2008 and Serbia 2012, where team took 12th place. Twice he got us among the world's elite for the  World Cup . In 2009 he led the World Championships in Croatia, where Slovakia took 10th place. Two years later, he also competed with the national team at the World Championships in Sweden, where team placed 17th. 

He was fired from Slovakia men's national handball team in 2016.

References

Living people
1961 births
Slovak handball coaches
Slovak people of German descent
Slovak people of Hungarian descent